Odontolabis femoralis is a beetle of the Family Lucanidae. It lives in Indonesia.

List of subspecies 
 Odontolabis femoralis femoralis Waterhouse, 1887
 Odontolabis femoralis kinabaluensis Möllenkamp, 1904
 Odontolabis femoralis waterstradti Von Rothenburg, 1900

Monograph 
 Lacroix, J.-P., 1984 - The Beetles of the World, volume 4, Odontolabini I (Lucanidae) - Genera Chalcodes, Odontolabis, Heterochtes.

Lucaninae
Insects of Indonesia
Odontolabis